Tamil Maanila Kamraj Congress is a political party in the Indian state of Tamil Nadu.

Background 
The party was formed in December 2002 through a split in the Tamil Maanila Congress. The party is led by Kumaradas (president), R. Eswaran (vice-president), Hakkim (general secretary), and Teni Jayakumar (treasurer). Five members of the Tamil Nadu legislative assembly have joined the party.

Political parties in Tamil Nadu
2002 establishments in Tamil Nadu
Political parties established in 2002
Registered unrecognised political parties in India